Pungamarathupatti is a village in Virudhunagar district, Tamil Nadu. It falls under Aruppukottai taluk.

Pungamarathupatti is 26 km away from Aruppukottai, 6 km north of Pudur and 6 km east of Pandalgudi, 100 houses are there, [agriculture] is the major work and nearly 10 percent of peoples serving in the Indian Army.

Neighbouring villages are Maravarperumgudi, Kalluppatti, Kanjampatti, Salukuvarpatti, Maniyarampatti, Krishnapuram and other.

Villages in Virudhunagar district